Gloria Payne Banfield is a Grenada politician and diplomat who served as Grenada's Permanent Representative to the United Nations in the 1980s. She was Minister Counselor for the Grenada Mission in New York and Washington and currently serves as the President of Grenada National Organization of Women (GNOW) Inc. She was leader of the Grenada United Labour Party (GULP) and ran for an election on the ticket of the party in 2003.

Career 
Banfield served in the government of Sir Eric Matthew Gairy as chair of the Public Service Commission and Secretary to Cabinet in the government of Sir Nicholas Brathwaite. She was President of the Grenada Netball Association of Extended Care through Hope and Optimism (ECHO) and President of Soroptimist International of Grenada.

References 

Living people
Year of birth missing (living people)
Grenada United Labour Party politicians
Grenadian politicians
Grenadian diplomats
20th-century Grenadian women politicians
20th-century Grenadian politicians
Permanent Representatives of Grenada to the United Nations